In Greek mythology, Nemea (Ancient Greek: Νεμέα or Νεμέαν means 'wooded district') was the eponymous nymph of Nemea, a district between Cleonae and Phlius in Argolis.

Family 
Nemea was one of the naiad daughters of the river-god Asopus and possibly Metope, the river-nymph daughter of the river Ladon. She was the sister of Salamis, Aegina, Corcyra, Thebe, Antiope, Cleone, Harpina, Plataea (Oeroe), and Tanagra.

In some account, Nemea's parentage is attributed to Zeus and Selene.

Notes

References 

 Diodorus Siculus, The Library of History translated by Charles Henry Oldfather. Twelve volumes. Loeb Classical Library. Cambridge, Massachusetts: Harvard University Press; London: William Heinemann, Ltd. 1989. Vol. 3. Books 4.59–8. Online version at Bill Thayer's Web Site
 Diodorus Siculus, Bibliotheca Historica. Vol 1-2. Immanel Bekker. Ludwig Dindorf. Friedrich Vogel. in aedibus B. G. Teubneri. Leipzig. 1888-1890. Greek text available at the Perseus Digital Library.
 Pausanias, Description of Greece with an English Translation by W.H.S. Jones, Litt.D., and H.A. Ormerod, M.A., in 4 Volumes. Cambridge, MA, Harvard University Press; London, William Heinemann Ltd. 1918. . Online version at the Perseus Digital Library
 Pausanias, Graeciae Descriptio. 3 vols. Leipzig, Teubner. 1903.  Greek text available at the Perseus Digital Library.

Naiads
Nymphs
Children of Asopus
Children of Zeus